The Divine Voyage (French: La divine croisière) is a 1929 French silent film directed by Julien Duvivier and starring Jean Murat, Thomy Bourdelle and Suzanne Christy.

Cast
 Jean Murat as Jacques de Saint-Ermont  
 Thomy Bourdelle as Mareuil  
 Suzanne Christy as Simone Ferjac  
 Charlotte Barbier-Krauss as Mme. de Saint-Ermont  
 Line Noro as Jeanne de Guiven  
 Louis Kerly as Le curé  
 Angèle Decori as Angélique 
 Henry Krauss as Claude Ferjac  
 Henri Valbel as Kerjean  
 Georges Paulais as Le matelot Brélez  
 François Viguier as Le Guénec  
 Pierre Mindaist 
 Alfred Argus

References

Bibliography 
 Eric Bonnefille. Julien Duvivier: 1896-1940. Harmattan, 2002.

External links 
 

1929 films
French silent feature films
1920s French-language films
Films directed by Julien Duvivier
French black-and-white films
1920s French films